is a railway station  on the Meitetsu Nagoya Main Line located in Minami-ku, Nagoya, Japan.

History
On 1 April 1935, the Aichi Electric Railway merged with the Nagoya Railroad (the forerunner of present-day Meitetsu).

Lines
Meitetsu
Meitetsu Nagoya Main Line

Layout
Moto Kasadera Station has two island platforms.

Platforms

Adjacent stations

External links
   Meitetsu Station information

Railway stations in Japan opened in 1917
Stations of Nagoya Railroad
Railway stations in Aichi Prefecture